The 2017 Ken Galluccio Cup was the ninth edition of the Ken Galluccio Cup, the European men's lacrosse club competition.

Turku Titans was the first Finnish team ever to win the title.

Competition format
The twelve teams were divided into four groups of three, where the two first qualified teams joined the quarterfinals.

Group stage

Group A

Group B

Group C

Group D

Championship bracket

Fifth-position bracket

Ninth-position group

References

External links
Official website
Competition at Pointbench.com

Ken Galluccio Cup
2017 in lacrosse
Ken Galluccio Cup